The Currency Act of 1870 (41st Congress, Sess. 2, ch. 252, enacted July 12, 1870) maintained greenbacks issued during the American Civil War at their existing level, about $356 million, neither contracting them nor issuing more. It replaced $45 million in "temporary loan certificates," paper bearing 3% interest but which circulated as currency, with the same amount of national bank notes issued by newly chartered banks. While achieving currency stabilization, the act answered midwestern pressure for more currency, and midwestern dissatisfaction with the concentration of national bank charters in the Northeast. The limit of the new bank note issue was small enough for northeastern Republicans to accept. Greenback Republicans could console themselves that the bill did not contemplate replacing greenbacks with national bank notes.

Legislative history 
The bill was sponsored by Senator John Sherman of Ohio. The act maintained greenbacks issued during the Civil War at their existing level, about $356 million, neither contracting them nor issuing more. It replaced $45 million in "temporary loan certificates," paper bearing 3% interest but which circulated as currency, with the same amount of national bank notes issued by newly chartered banks. While achieving currency stabilization, the act answered midwestern pressure for more currency, and midwestern dissatisfaction with the concentration of national bank charters in the Northeast. The limit of the new bank note issue was small enough for northeastern Republicans to accept. Greenback Republicans could console themselves that the bill did not contemplate replacing greenbacks with national bank notes.

1870 in American law
United States federal currency legislation